Petrich is a surname found in Bulgarian, Slovenian, Croatian and Serbian. It may refer to:

 Bob Petrich, American football player
 Henryk Petrich, Polish boxer
 Jim Petrich, Australian businessman
 Soma Orlai Petrich, Hungarian painter of Serbian descent

Bulgarian-language surnames
Serbian surnames